The TAKE Solutions Masters was a golf tournament on the Asian Tour. It was co-sanctioned with the Professional Golf Tour of India.

The TAKE Solutions India Masters was played on the Asian Development Tour in 2014 and 2015. It was held at Eagleton Golf Resort, Bangalore, in late October and early November. Prize money was US$70,000 in 2014 and US$120,000 in 2015. It was played for the first time as an Asian Tour event  in August 2017 at the Karnataka Golf Association Golf Course, Bangalore, India. Prize money was US$300,000 in 2017, increasing to US$350,000 in 2018.

Winners

Notes

References

External links
Coverage on the Asian Tour's official site
Coverage on the PGTI official site

Former Asian Tour events
Golf tournaments in India